Maurice Hirsch (born 30 May 1993) is a German footballer who plays as a defensive midfielder for VfB Gartenstadt.

Club career
Hirsch is a youth exponent from Hannover 96. He made his Bundesliga debut at 25 October 2014 against Borussia Dortmund substitung Marius Stankevičius after 72 minutes in a 0–1 away win. He joined SpVgg Greuther Fürth on 19 January 2016.

References

External links
 
 
 Maurice Hirsch at FuPa

1993 births
Living people
Footballers from Mannheim
Association football midfielders
German footballers
Hannover 96 players
Bundesliga players
Regionalliga players
Hannover 96 II players
SpVgg Greuther Fürth players
Stuttgarter Kickers players
SV Waldhof Mannheim players